Anderson, Illinois may refer to:
Anderson, Cass County, Illinois, an unincorporated community in Cass County
Anderson, Macoupin County, Illinois, an unincorporated community in Macoupin County